Judy Astley is an English illustrator and author of over 20 novels all published by Black Swan. Her first novel was published in 1994 since when she has published one novel nearly every year. She has also written articles for The Times. as well as short stories for My Weekly and Woman magazines.

Biography
Judy Astley was born in Blackburn, Lancashire though has spent most of her life in Twickenham. Before becoming an author she spent some time as a freelance designer and dressmaker for Liberty. She is married to record producer Jon Astley and has two adult daughters.

Bibliography

Children's books
When One Cat Woke Up: A Cat Counting Book (1990)

Novels
Just for the Summer (1994)
Pleasant Vices (1995)
Seven for a Secret (1996)
Muddy Waters (1997)
Every Good Girl (1998)
The Right Thing (1999)
Excess Baggage (2000)
No Place for a Man (2001)
Unchained Melanie (2002)
Away from It All (2003)
Size Matters (2004)
All Inclusive (2005)
Blowing It (2006)
Laying the Ghost (2007)
Other People's Husbands (2008)
The Look of Love (2011)
I Should Be So Lucky (2012)
In the Summertime (2013)
It Must Have Been the Mistletoe (2014)
A Merry Mistletoe Wedding (2015)

References

External links
Author website
Judy Astley on Fantastic Fiction
Interview with Judy Astley

Year of birth missing (living people)
Living people
English women novelists
People from Blackburn
People from Twickenham
20th-century English novelists
21st-century English novelists
English short story writers
British women short story writers
20th-century English women writers
21st-century English women writers
20th-century British short story writers
21st-century British short story writers